Scrobipalpa halymella is a moth of the family Gelechiidae. It was described by Milliere in 1864. It is found on the Canary Islands and Malta as well as in Portugal, France and Italy. Outside of Europe, it is found in Morocco, Tunisia and Israel.

References

External links
 Scrobipalpa halymella in gwannon catalog

Moths described in 1864
Scrobipalpa
Moths of Europe